Cipriano Purugganan Primicias Sr. (September 14, 1901 – September 20, 1965) was a Filipino politician, who was best known for his service as a Senator of the Philippines.  He was born in 1901 at Alcala, in the northern Philippine province of Pangasinan to Javier Crescini Primicias and Cristeta Purugganan.

Education and early career

He completed his elementary education with highest honors, his high school courses with second-highest honors and passed the government first grade civil service tests when he was still in high school in 1919. He enrolled in the National Law College and at the same time worked as a clerk in the Bureau of Commerce in 1919 where he rose to the rank of Chief, Commercial Section.  He finished his Bachelor of Laws degree in 1923 with highest honors and passed the bar examinations in the top five that same year.

In 1924, he quit his post at the Bureau of Commerce and began his law practice as an assistant attorney in the law office of then-Senator Alejo R. Mabanag. By 1936 he was the President of the Pangasinan Bar Association, a post he held till 1945.

Political career

House of Representatives

A ranking member of the Nacionalista Party (NP), Primicias entered politics in 1934 when he was elected to the Philippine House of Representatives from the fourth district of Pangasinan.  He represented his district for three consecutive terms beginning in 1934, 1941 and 1946. Being in the then-minority party at the time, Primicias was an oppositionist and fiscalizer in the House of Representatives.

Bell Trade Act of 1946

During his last term in the House, Primicias was one of nine Congressmen and three senators who opposed the ratification of the United States' Bell Trade Act of 1946 (also called the Philippine Trade Act of 1946) mostly because it required amending the Philippine Constitution to give American citizens and corporations equal access with Filipinos to the Philippines' natural resources.  In addition the law also gave U.S. citizens the right to import goods without paying import duties and fixed the value of the Philippine peso to the U.S. dollar. Primicias and other opponents of the Bell Trade Act considered the measure an inexcusable surrender of Philippine sovereignty.

Because ratification of the Bell Trade Act required a two-thirds vote of the House and the Senate, Primicias - with the eight other Congressmen and the three senators - were unseated from the Philippine Congress on spurious charges while the ratification process was underway in order to ensure its passage. Upon appeal to the Philippine Supreme Court all twelve legislators were reinstated, but by that time their temporary ejection had served its purpose and the Bell Trade Act had already been ratified.

During his last term in the House (1946–1949), Primicias served as the Minority Floor Leader.  From 1946 till 1964 he was the Nacionalista Party Vice-President.

Senate

In the 1951 Philippine midterm elections, Primicias was elected in an 8-0 shut-out by the Nacionalista Party to his first term as a Senator.

While in the Philippine Senate he became chairman of the following Committees: Finance (1952–1953), Labor (1952–1953), Public Works (1953), Justice (1958–1960), Appointments (1958–1960) and the powerful Committee on Rules (1953–1963) as well as a member of the Senate Electoral Tribunal (1954–1963).
 
He was reelected to the Senate for a second term in 1957. From 1953 till 1963 Senator Primicias was the Senate Majority Floor Leader.

Other positions

Four-time Vice-President, World Inter-Parliamentary Union Conference: 1954 (Vienna), 1956 (Bangkok), 1958 (Rio de Janeiro), and 1960 (Tokyo).
Member, Council of State, 1953 to 1963.

Senator Primicias was also the former Dean of the College of Law in Orient College, President of the Pindangan Agricultural Company and the Lingayen Gulf Fishing Company and was a member of the Knights of Columbus.

Personal life

In 1930, Primicias married Miss Pangasinan Nieves Ocampo Benito, with whom he had nine children: Cipriano Jr. (Tito) – himself a former Congressman and Governor of Pangasinan; Ma. Corazon (Marietta); Ricardo; Juan Augusto; Ramon; Edmundo; Carlos; Perla; and Baby Nieves.

An ardent Hispanist, Primicias spoke fluent Spanish and regularly debated on the Senate floor in that language. He also spoke English, Filipino, Ilocano, and Pangansinense with equal facility.

He died a week after his 64th birthday in Quezon City, Philippines, on September 20, 1965.

Footnotes

References

External links
Official Website of the Senate of the Philippines
The NP Convention Story, 1953

1901 births
1965 deaths
Majority leaders of the Senate of the Philippines
Senators of the 5th Congress of the Philippines
Senators of the 4th Congress of the Philippines
Senators of the 3rd Congress of the Philippines
Senators of the 2nd Congress of the Philippines
People from Pangasinan
Nacionalista Party politicians
Members of the House of Representatives of the Philippines from Pangasinan
20th-century Filipino lawyers
Minority leaders of the House of Representatives of the Philippines
Members of the Philippine Legislature